Bemis Historic District, in Bemis, Tennessee and Jackson, Tennessee, is a historic district that was listed on the National Register of Historic Places in 1991. It includes Bungalow/Craftsman, Mission/Spanish Revival, Dutch Colonial Revival and other architecture.

The district was a planned community developed within the southern part of the city of Jackson, Tennessee that was a company town for Bemis Industries.

References

Historic districts on the National Register of Historic Places in Tennessee
Mission Revival architecture in Tennessee
Geography of Madison County, Tennessee